In Abrahamic religions, the Garden of Eden or Garden of God ( and ), also called the Terrestrial Paradise, is the biblical paradise described in Genesis 2–3 and Ezekiel 28 and 31.

The location of Eden is described in the Book of Genesis as the source of four tributaries. Various suggestions have been made for its location: at the head of the Persian Gulf, in southern Mesopotamia (now Iraq) where the Tigris and Euphrates rivers run into the sea; and in Armenia.

Like the Genesis flood narrative, the Genesis creation narrative and the account of the Tower of Babel, the story of Eden echoes the Mesopotamian myth of a king, as a primordial man, who is placed in a divine garden to guard the tree of life. The Hebrew Bible depicts Adam and Eve as walking around the Garden of Eden naked due to their sinlessness.

Mentions of Eden are also made in the Bible elsewhere in Genesis, in Isaiah 51:3, Ezekiel 36:35, and Joel 2:3; Zechariah 14 and Ezekiel 47 use paradisical imagery without naming Eden.

Another interpretation associates the name with a Hebrew word for 'pleasure'; thus the Vulgate reads  in Genesis 2:8, and the Douay–Rheims Bible, following, has the wording "And the Lord God had planted a paradise of pleasure".

For some Christians, especially in the Orthodox tradition, Eden is considered a reality outside of empirical history that effects the entire history of the universe as seen in the idea of an atemporal fall that separates humanity's current reduced form of time from the divine life enjoyed in Eden. This idea of an atemporal separation from Eden has been most recently defended by theologians David Bentley Hart, John Behr, and Sergei Bulgakov as well as having roots in the writings of several early church fathers, especially Origen and Maximus the Confessor.

Biblical narratives

Genesis

The second part of the Genesis creation narrative, Genesis 2:4–3:24, opens with YHWH-Elohim (translated here "the  God") creating the first man (Adam), whom he placed in a garden that he planted "eastward in Eden":

The man was free to eat from any tree in the garden except the tree of the knowledge of good and evil, which were taboo. Last of all, God made a woman (Eve) from a rib of the man to be a companion for the man. In Genesis 3, the man and the woman were seduced by the serpent into eating the forbidden fruit, and they were expelled from the garden to prevent them from eating of the tree of life, and thus living forever. Cherubim were placed east of the garden, "and a flaming sword which turned every way, to guard the way of the tree of life".

Genesis 2:10–14 lists four rivers in association with the garden of Eden: Pishon, Gihon, Hiddekel (the Tigris), and Phirat (the Euphrates). It also refers to the land of Cush—translated/interpreted as Ethiopia, but thought by some to equate to Cossaea, a Greek name for the land of the Kassites. These lands lie north of Elam, immediately to the east of ancient Babylon, which, unlike Ethiopia, does lie within the region being described. In Antiquities of the Jews, the first-century Jewish historian Josephus identifies the Pishon as what "the Greeks called Ganges" and the Geon (Gehon) as the Nile.

Ezekiel

In Ezekiel 28:12–19, the prophet Ezekiel the "son of man" sets down God's word against the king of Tyre: the king was the "seal of perfection", adorned with precious stones from the day of his creation, placed by God in the garden of Eden on the holy mountain as a guardian cherub. However, the king sinned through wickedness and violence, and so he was driven out of the garden and thrown to the earth, where now he is consumed by God's fire: "All those who knew you in the nations are appalled at you, you have come to a horrible end and will be no more." (Ezekiel 28:19).

According to Terje Stordalen, the Eden in Ezekiel appears to be located in Lebanon. "[I]t appears that the Lebanon is an alternative placement in Phoenician myth (as in Ez 28,13, III.48) of the Garden of Eden", and there are connections between paradise, the Garden of Eden and the forests of Lebanon (possibly used symbolically) within prophetic writings. Edward Lipinski and Peter Kyle McCarter have suggested that the garden of the gods, the oldest Sumerian analog of the Garden of Eden, relates to a mountain sanctuary in the Lebanon and Anti-Lebanon ranges.

Proposed locations

The location of Eden is described in Genesis 2:10–14:

Suggestions for the location of the Garden of Eden include the head of the Persian Gulf, as argued by Juris Zarins, in southern Mesopotamia (now Iraq and Kuwait) where the Tigris and Euphrates rivers run into the sea; and in the Armenian Highlands or Armenian Plateau. British archaeologist David Rohl locates it in Iran, and in the vicinity of Tabriz, but this suggestion has not caught on with scholarly sources.

Some religious groups have believed the location of the garden to be local to them, outside of the Middle East. Some early leaders of Mormonism held that it was located in Jackson County, Missouri. The 20th-century Panacea Society believed it was located at the site of their home town of Bedford, England, while preacher Elvy E. Callaway believed it was on the Apalachicola River in Florida, near the town of Bristol. Some suggested that the location is in Jerusalem.

On his third voyage to the Americas in 1498, Christopher Columbus thought he may have reached the Earthly Paradise upon first seeing the South American mainland.

Parallel concepts

A number of parallel concepts to the biblical Garden of Eden exist in various other religions and mythologies. Dilmun in the Sumerian story of Enki and Ninhursag is a paradisaical abode of the immortals, where sickness and death were unknown. The garden of the Hesperides in Greek mythology was also somewhat similar to the Jewish concept of the Garden of Eden, and by the 16th century a larger intellectual association was made in the Cranach painting. In this painting, only the action that takes place there identifies the setting as distinct from the Garden of the Hesperides, with its golden fruit.

The word "paradise" entered English from the French , inherited from the Latin , from the Greek . The Greek, in turn, was derived from an Old Iranian form, itself from the Proto-Iranian *parādaiĵah-, "walled enclosure", which was derived from the Old Persian  (p-r-d-y-d-a-m, whence from the Avestan , . The literal meaning of this word is "walled (enclosure)", from pairi- 'around' (cognate with the Greek  and the English peri-, of identical meaning), and -diz, "to make, form (a wall), build" (cognate with the Greek , 'wall').

(Genesis 2:8, Ezekiel 28:13): it is from this usage that the use of "paradise" to refer to the Garden of Eden derives.

The idea of a walled enclosure was not preserved in most Iranian usage, and generally came to refer to a plantation or other cultivated area, not necessarily walled.

The word  occurs three times in the Hebrew Bible, but always in contexts other than a connection with Eden: in the Song of Solomon 4:13: "Thy plants are an orchard of pomegranates, with pleasant fruits; camphire, with spikenard"; Ecclesiastes 2:5: "I made me gardens and orchards, and I planted trees in them of all kind of fruits"; and in Nehemiah 2:8: "And a letter unto Asaph the keeper of the king's orchard, that he may give me timber to make beams for the gates of the palace which appertained to the house, and for the wall of the city." In these examples,  clearly means "orchard" or "park", but in the apocalyptic literature and in the Talmud "paradise" gains its associations with the Garden of Eden and its heavenly prototype, and in the New Testament "paradise" becomes the realm of the blessed (as opposed to the realm of the cursed) among those who have already died, with literary Hellenistic influences.

Other views

Jewish eschatology

In the Talmud and the Jewish Kabbalah, the scholars agree that there are two types of spiritual places called "Garden in Eden". The first is rather terrestrial, of abundant fertility and luxuriant vegetation, known as the "lower  Eden" ( meaning garden). The second is envisioned as being celestial, the habitation of righteous, Jewish and non-Jewish, immortal souls, known as the "higher  Eden".

According to Jewish eschatology, the higher  Eden is called the "Garden of Righteousness". It has been created since the beginning of the world, and will appear gloriously at the end of time. The righteous dwelling there will enjoy the sight of the heavenly  carrying the throne of God. Each of the righteous will walk with God, who will lead them in a dance. Its Jewish and non-Jewish inhabitants are "clothed with garments of light and eternal life, and eat of the tree of life" (Enoch 58,3) near to God and his anointed ones.

In modern Jewish eschatology it is believed that history will complete itself and the ultimate destination will be when all mankind returns to the Garden of Eden.

Legends
In the 1909 book Legends of the Jews, Louis Ginzberg compiled Jewish legends found in rabbinic literature. Among the legends are ones about the two Gardens of Eden. Beyond Paradise is the higher  Eden, where God is enthroned and explains the Torah to its inhabitants. The higher  Eden contains three hundred and ten worlds and is divided into seven compartments. The compartments are not described, though it is implied that each compartment is greater than the previous one and is joined based on one's merit.  The first compartment is for Jewish martyrs, the second for those who drowned, the third for "Rabbi Johanan ben Zakkai and his disciples," the fourth for those whom the cloud of glory carried off, the fifth for penitents, the sixth for youths who have never sinned; and the seventh for the poor who lived decently and studied the Torah.

In chapter two, Legends of the Jews gives a brief description of the lower  Eden. The tree of knowledge is a hedge around the tree of life, which is so vast that "it would take a man five hundred years to traverse a distance equal to the diameter of the trunk". From beneath the trees flow all the world's waters in the form of four rivers: Tigris, Nile, Euphrates, and Ganges. After the fall of man, the world was no longer irrigated by this water. While in the garden, though, Adam and Eve were served meat dishes by angels and the animals of the world understood human language, respected mankind as God's image, and feared Adam and Eve. When one dies, one's soul must pass through the lower  Eden in order to reach the higher  Eden. The way to the garden is the Cave of Machpelah that Adam guards. The cave leads to the gate of the garden, guarded by a cherub with a flaming sword. If a soul is unworthy of entering, the sword annihilates it. Within the garden is a pillar of fire and smoke that extends to the higher  Eden, which the soul must climb in order to reach the higher  Eden.

Islamic view

The term  ("Gardens of Eden" or "Gardens of Perpetual Residence") is used in the Quran for the destination of the righteous. There are several mentions of "the Garden" in the Quran, while the Garden of Eden, without the word , is commonly the fourth layer of the Islamic heaven and not necessarily thought as the dwelling place of Adam. The Quran refers frequently over various Surah about the first abode of Adam and Hawwa (Eve), including surat Sad, which features 18 verses on the subject (38:71–88), surat al-Baqara, surat al-A'raf, and surat al-Hijr although sometimes without mentioning the location. The narrative mainly surrounds the resulting expulsion of Hawwa and Adam after they were tempted by Iblis (Satan). Despite the biblical account, the Quran mentions only one tree in Eden, the tree of immortality, from which God specifically forbade Adam and Eve. Some exegesis added an account, about Satan, disguised as a serpent to enter the Garden, repeatedly told Adam to eat from the tree, and eventually both Adam and Eve did so, resulting in disobeying God. These stories are also featured in the hadith collections, including al-Tabari.
Quranic scripture of story
Quranic verses Q.2:35-8, are believed to tell the story of Adam disobeying God’s command and eating the Forbidden Fruit, and of God ordered him out of the Garden. One translation (the Clear Quran) that indicates that the Garden of Eden was in Heaven goes: 
 We cautioned, “O Adam! Live with your wife in Paradise (lit. "the Garden") and eat as freely as you please, but do not approach this tree, or else you will be wrongdoers.” (2:35) 
 But Satan deceived them—leading to their fall from the [blissful] state they were in,1 and We said, “Descend from the heavens [to the earth] as enemies to each other.2 You will find in the earth a residence and provision for your appointed stay.”  (2:36) 
 Then Adam was inspired with words ˹of prayer˺ by his Lord, so He accepted his repentance. Surely He is the Accepter of Repentance, Most Merciful. (2:37) 
 We said, “Descend all of you! Then when guidance comes to you from Me, whoever follows it, there will be no fear for them, nor will they grieve. (2:38) 
Location
Quranic verses describe Adam was being expelled from al-Jannah, "the garden", which is the commonly used  word for paradise in Islam. However, according to Ibn Kathir (d. 1372) and Ar-Razi (d. 1209), (exegetes of the Quran), four interpretations of the location of the garden prevailed among early Muslims: 
that the garden was Paradise itself, 
that it was a separate garden created especially for Adam and Eve, 
that it was located on Earth,  
that it was best for the Muslims not to be concerned with the location of the garden. 
According to one T.O. Shanavas however, contextual analysis  of Quranic verses suggests the  Garden of Eden could not have been in Paradise and must have been on earth. (For example a sahih hadith reports Muhammad said: “Allah says: I have prepared for my righteous servants that which has neither been seen by eyes, nor heard by ears, nor ever conceived by any man.” i.e. no man has ever seen Paradise. Since Adam was a man, he could not have seen paradise, therefore he could not have lived there.)
Doctrine of "The Fall of Man"
Islamic exegesis does not regard Adam and Eve's expulsion from paradise as punishment for disobedience or a result from abused free will on their part. Instead, ibn Qayyim al-Jawziyya (1292-1350) writes,  God's wisdom (ḥikma) destined humanity to leave the garden and settle on earth. This is because God wants to unfold the full range of his attributes. If humans were not to live on earth, God couldn't express his love, forgiveness, and power to his creation. Further, if humans were not to experience suffering, they could neither long for paradise nor appreciate its delights. Khwaja Abdullah Ansari (1006–1088) describes Adam and Eve's expulsion as ultimately caused by God.  Nonetheless, despite the paradoxical notion that man has no choice but to comply to God's will, this does not mean that humans should not blame themselves for their "sin" of complying. This is exemplified by Adam and Eve in the Quran (Q.7:23  “Our Lord! We have wronged ourselves. If You do not forgive us and have mercy on us, we will certainly be losers”), in contrast to Iblis (Satan) who blames God for leading him astray (Q.15:37).

Latter Day Saints

Followers of the Latter Day Saint movement believe that after Adam and Eve were expelled from the Garden of Eden they resided in a place known as Adam-ondi-Ahman, located in present-day Daviess County, Missouri. It is recorded in the Doctrine and Covenants that Adam blessed his posterity there and that he will return to that place at the time of the final judgment in fulfillment of a prophecy set forth in the Bible.

Numerous early leaders of the Church, including Brigham Young, Heber C. Kimball, and George Q. Cannon, taught that the Garden of Eden itself was located in nearby Jackson County, but there are no surviving first-hand accounts of that doctrine being taught by Joseph Smith himself. LDS doctrine is unclear as to the exact location of the Garden of Eden, but tradition among Latter-Day Saints places it somewhere in the vicinity of Adam-ondi-Ahman, or in Jackson County.

Gnosticism
The 2nd-century Gnostic teacher Justin held that there were three original divinities, a transcendental being called the Good, an intermediate male figure known as Elohim and Eden who is an Earth-mother. The world is created from the love of Elohim and Eden, but evil later is brought into the universe when Elohim learns of the existence of the Good above him and ascends trying to reach it.

Art and literature

Art 
One of oldest depictions of Garden of Eden is made in Byzantine style in Ravenna, while the city was still under Byzantine control. A preserved blue mosaic is part of the mausoleum of Galla Placidia. Circular motifs represent flowers of the garden of Eden. The Garden of Eden motifs most frequently portrayed in illuminated manuscripts and paintings are the "Sleep of Adam" ("Creation of Eve"), the "Temptation of Eve" by the Serpent, the "Fall of Man" where Adam takes the fruit, and the "Expulsion". The idyll of "Naming Day in Eden" was less often depicted. Michelangelo depicted a scene at the Garden of Eden on the Sistine Chapel ceiling.

Literature
For many medieval writers, the image of the Garden of Eden also creates a location for human love and sexuality, often associated with the classic and medieval trope of the locus amoenus. 

In the Divine Comedy, Dante Alighieri places the Garden at the top of Mt. Purgatory. Dante, the pilgrim, emerges into the Garden of Eden in Canto 28 of Purgatorio. Here he is told that God gave the Garden of Eden to man "in earnest, or as a pledge of eternal life," but man was only able to dwell there for a short time because he soon fell from grace. In the poem, the Garden of Eden is both human and divine: while it is located on earth at the top of Mt. Purgatory, it also serves as the gateway to the heavens.

Much of Milton's Paradise Lost occurs in the Garden of Eden.

The first act of Arthur Miller's 1972 play Creation of the World and Other Business is set in the Garden of Eden.

See also

 Antelapsarianism
 Caucasus mixed forests
 Christian naturism
 Epic of Gilgamesh
 Eridu
 Fertile Crescent
 Golden Age
 Heaven in Judaism
 Hesperides
 Hyrcanian forests
 Jannah
 Mazandaran (Shahnameh)
 Nondualism
 Persian gardens
 Purgatorio
 Sacred garden
 The Summerland
 Tamoanchan
 Utopia
 Atemporal fall

Notes

References

Bibliography 
 
 
  Translated by Willard R. Trask.
 
 
 
 
 
 
 
 
 Willcocks, Sir William, Hormuzd Rassam. Mesopotamian Trade. Noah's Flood: The Garden of Eden, in: The Geographical Journal 35 , No. 4 (April 1910). DOI: 10.2307/1777041

External links

 Many translations of II Kings 19:12
 

 
Adam and Eve
Akkadian language
Bereshit (parashah)
Biblical phrases
Book of Ezekiel
Book of Genesis
Christian cosmology
Conceptions of heaven
Islamic eschatology
Jannah
Persian Gulf
Torah places